Greater Manaus (Grande Manaus, officially Região Metropolitana de Manaus, in Portuguese) is a large metropolitan area located in Amazonas state in Brazil. It consists of 13 municipalities, including the capital, Manaus.

Economy
Its GDP is estimated at 61 billion dollars, the richest in northern Brazil.

Manaus Free Trade Zone
Greater Manaus is home to one of the most modern industrial centers of Latin America. This is a large concentration of high-tech industries in the areas of electronics, two-wheeled vehicles, optical products, computer products, chemical industry, etc.

The Manaus Free Trade Zone (MFTZ), which is regulated by Decree-Law No. 288/1967, was conceived as a free import and export trade area with special tax incentives. It was set up with the object of creating an industrial, commercial and agricultural center in the hinterland of the Amazon Region, which would be equipped with economic conditions that would enable the region to be occupied and developed.

Today, around fifty years after it was founded, the Manaus Free Trade Zone represents a virtuous Brazilian government development model that has managed to make a socio-economic base in the Amazon region feasible, promote the better productive and social integration of the region with the rest of Brazil, and guarantee national sovereignty over its borders.

During its historical evolution, the Manaus Free Trade Zone has enabled three economic hubs to be developed: industrial, commercial and agricultural. The first of these, represented by the Manaus Industrial Sector (PIM), is considered to be the foundation stone that sustains the model.

The Manaus Free Trade Zone model is administered by the Superintendence of the Manaus Free Trade Zone (SUFRAMA), an independent Federal Agency under the Brazilian Ministry of Development, Industry and Foreign Trade (MDIC).

Demographics
The metropolitan area of Manaus is the 11th most populous in Brazil, with an estimated population of 2.7 million inhabitants.

References

Manaus
Manaus